My Fantastic Pag-ibig is a 2021 Philippine television drama romance anthology broadcast by GMA News TV and GTV. It premiered on January 30, 2021 on GMA News TV's Saturday evening line up. In February 2021, GMA News TV was rebranded as GTV, with the show being carried over. The show concluded on October 30, 2021.

Cast and characters
Love Wars
 Kim de Leon as Milos / Pido
 Lexi Gonzales as Lovelyn Donato
 Rodjun Cruz as Amadeus / Amado
 Divine Aucina as Freya Cruz
 Maey Bautista as Cher Santos
 Mike Liwag as Jed Reyes

Exchange of Hearts
 Migo Adecer as Popoy
 Kate Valdez as Celine
 Maureen Larrazabal as Chinchin
 Jordan Herrera as Boyet
 Kevin Sagra as Justin
 Karenina Haniel as Grace

Ghosted
 Royce Cabrera as Gio Medina
 Ella Cristofani as Sunshine “Shine” Ilagan
 Philip Lazaro as Dawn
 Long Mejia as Mr. T
 Sue Prado as Helen Medina
 Benedix Ramos as Daniel

Fairy Tale Romance
 Yasser Marta as Nep
 Alex Diaz as Lantis
 Jo Berry as Kabibabe
 Cecil Paz as Bebot
 Skelly Clarkson as Toktok

Trophy Girl
 Arra San Agustin as Mariquit
 Jak Roberto as Baste
 Ashley Ortega as Cassie

Dear Ghostwriter
 Juancho Trivino as Joshua
 Jelai Andres as Purple
 Angeli Nicole Sanoy as Weng
 Terry Gian as Reporter
 Abet Raz as Betchay

Hu Luvs Me Not
 Martin del Rosario as Zach Florencio
 Ayra Mariano as Pink Who / Black Who
 Mikoy Morales as JV Amadeus
 Ara Altamira as Roxy Florencio

Fallen
 Althea Ablan as Bituin
 Prince Clemente as Yloon / Kunzumi
 Giselle Sanchez as Mama Eva
 Dayara Shane as Venus
 Rob Sy as Daddy Joe

Ganda Problems
 Ayeesha Cervantes as Barang / Barbara
 Paul Salas as Hector
 Crystal Paras as Fantasia
 Lovely Rivero as Mama Grace

Invisiboi
 Dave Duque as Buboi
 Elle Villanueva as Thea
 James Teng as Diego
 Lou Veloso as Professor Z
 Gene Padilla as Buboi's Father
 Dang Cruz as Dra. Damon

The Lucky One
 Therese Malvar as Wendy
 Elijah Canlas as Dwayne
 Mel Kimura as Emily

Beast Next Door
 Gil Cuerva as Wanggo
 Sophie Albert as Ashley
 Brent Valdez as Jordan
 Yesh Burce as Elisa

References

External links
 
 

2021 Philippine television series debuts
2021 Philippine television series endings
Filipino-language television shows
GMA Integrated News and Public Affairs shows
GMA News TV original programming
GTV (Philippine TV network) original programming
Philippine anthology television series